

The 1946 Dominican Republic earthquake occurred on August 4 at 17:51 UTC near Samaná, Dominican Republic. The mainshock measured 7.8 on the moment magnitude scale and 8.1 on the surface wave magnitude scale. An aftershock occurred four days later on August 8 at 13:28 UTC with a moment magnitude of 7.0. A tsunami was generated by the initial earthquake and caused widespread devastation across Hispaniola. The tsunami was observed in much of the Caribbean and the northwestern Atlantic Ocean.

A small tsunami was also recorded by tide gauges at San Juan in Puerto Rico, Bermuda and in the United States at Daytona Beach, Florida and Atlantic City, New Jersey.

See also
 List of earthquakes in 1946
 List of earthquakes in the Dominican Republic
 List of earthquakes in the Caribbean

References

Further reading

External links

Dominican Republic Earthquake, 1946
Earthquakes in the Dominican Republic
Earthquake
1946 tsunamis
Tsunamis in the Dominican Republic